Macchia Valfortore is a town and comune in the Province of Campobasso, Molise, southern Italy.

History
In 216 BC, a Roman army under consul Varro camped in the town called Maccla, thought to be this town, prior to marching to the  defeat against Hannibal at the Battle of Cannae. In 476 AD with the Western Roman Empire weakening, Maccla was occupied by the Visigoths. In the early Middle Ages it was a possession of the Lombards, who held it until 982, when they were defeated by the Byzantines.

On September 21, 1701, Gaetano Giacomo Gambacorta, styled the Prince of Macchia, started a conspiracy (Macchia Conspiracy), against the Spanish viceroy in Naples. The revolt was quickly put down and Gaetano fled to Vienna, Austria where he died on January 27, 1703. In 1800 Joseph Bonaparte, King of Naples and Napoleon's brother, divided Naples into new administrative orders. This created the Province of Campobasso which Macchia is located to this day. The suffix Valfortore was added in the 19th century.

Main sights
Church of San Nicola: 16th century church with 12 busts of Saints made of wood created by Giacomo Colombus of Naples.
Cinelli Palace
Monument to the Fallen
Monument of Padre Pio

References

Cities and towns in Molise